= Internal Medicine (Springer journal) =

- Language: German

Publication details
- Former name(s): Kongresszentralblatt für die gesamte Innere Medizin und ihre Grenzgebiete: Offizielles Organ der Deutschen Gesellschaft für Innere Medizin
- History: 1912–1991
- Publisher: Springer
- ISO 4: Find out here

Indexing
- ISSN: 0931-4695

Internal Medicine, titled Zentralblatt innere Medizin or Innere Medizin in German, formerly titled Kongresszentralblatt für die gesamte Innere Medizin und ihre Grenzgebiete: Offizielles Organ der Deutschen Gesellschaft für Innere Medizin, was a German medical journal with a broad focus on internal medicine, published by Springer, as the official publication of the German Society of Internal Medicine. It was founded in 1912 and published until 1991. The last editions had the English and German titles as equivalent parallel titles.
